Juraj Segarić (born 20 June 1993) is a Croatian professional basketball player, who is currently playing as a point guard for KK Sonik-Puntamika of the HT Premijer liga.

External links
 Profile at eurobasket.com

References

1993 births
Living people
ABA League players
BC Beroe players
Croatian men's basketball players
HKK Široki players
KK Zadar players
KK Zagreb players
Point guards
Basketball players from Zadar
KK Borik Puntamika players
KK Jazine Arbanasi players
Helios Suns players